William Trevor Larkham (10 November 1929 – 3 April 2004) was an English first-class cricketer who played a single first-class match for Worcestershire against Yorkshire in 1952, as a replacement for Roly Jenkins. In an innings defeat, he took just one wicket, that of Willie Watson, and made 0 and 13 with the bat.

Larkham played much club cricket for Kidderminster Cricket Club.
He was born and died in Kidderminster, Worcestershire.

References

External links
 

1929 births
2004 deaths
English cricketers
Worcestershire cricketers
Sportspeople from Kidderminster